Kinder Bueno (Kinder is German for "children", bueno is Spanish for "good") is a chocolate biscuit and wafer confection made by Italian confectionery maker Ferrero. Part of the Kinder Chocolate brand line, Kinder Bueno is a hazelnut-cream-filled, wafer covered in milk chocolate and a dark chocolate drizzle.

Kinder Bueno was launched in 1990 and is available in 60 countries. It is sold in packs of two, three, six, and boxes of twelve.

Production 
The Kinder Bueno bar is made in the factories of France and Warsaw, Poland. As of 2022, a new production facility for the North American market is being constructed in Bloomington, Illinois.

Product range 

 Kinder Bueno
 Kinder Bueno White — Kinder Bueno coated with white chocolate and covered in cocoa meringue pieces
 Kinder Bueno Coconut — Kinder Bueno with hazelnut cream encased in a coconut milk and white chocolate-covered wafer bar dusted with coconut flakes
 Kinder Bueno Dark — Kinder Bueno covered in dark chocolate
 Kinder Bueno Mini — Bite-sized and individually wrapped Kinder Bueno. Also available in Mini Mix bags, which contains a mix of classic, dark and white Kinder Bueno Mini.
 Kinder Bueno Advent Calendar — Advent calendar containing a mix of classic, dark and white Kinder Bueno Mini
 Kinder Bueno Eggs — Mini chocolate easter eggs
 Kinder Bueno Ice Cream — Cone ice cream, available in the classic and white chocolate flavour

Mineral oil aromatic hydrocarbon contamination
The European Food Safety Authority found the chocolate to be contaminated with high levels of mineral oil aromatic hydrocarbons (MOAH), a likely carcinogen. Hydrocarbon contamination is often caused by grain processing techniques, or is introduced to the food by the product's packaging. Kinder's parent company Ferrero disagreed with the EFSA finding, and maintained all products contain below the maximum levels for human consumption. Other common chocolate products were found to contain similar or higher levels of contamination.

References

External links

 

Ferrero SpA brands
Chocolate bars
Chocolate confectionery